Gibberula vitium is a species of very small sea snail, a marine gastropod mollusk or micromollusk in the family Cystiscidae.

Description
The length of the shell attains 2.14 mm.

Distribution
This species occurs in the Caribbean Sea off Venezuela.

References

vitium
Gastropods described in 2008